¡Amigos X Siempre! is a soundtrack for the Mexican television series ¡Amigos X Siempre! ("Friends 4 Ever"), it was released in Mexico by Sony BMG.

Information 
The CD contains the music from the series performed for the cast, including Belinda, Martín Ricca, Ernesto Laguardia, Adriana Fonceca and the "Amigos X Siempre": Ronald, Oscar, Daniela, Naidelyn, Christopher, Griselle Margarita and Mickey. The soundtrack was certified platinum in Mexico.

Track listing

Charts and certifications

Charts

Certifications

References 

2000 soundtrack albums
Television soundtracks